In theoretical computer science, the PACELC theorem is an extension to the CAP theorem. It states that in case of network partitioning (P) in a distributed computer system, one has to choose between availability (A) and consistency (C) (as per the CAP theorem), but else (E), even when the system is running normally in the absence of partitions, one has to choose between latency (L) and consistency (C).

Overview 

PACELC builds on the CAP theorem. Both theorems describe how distributed databases have limitations and tradeoffs regarding consistency, availability, and partition tolerance. PACELC however goes further and states that an additional trade-off exists: between latency and consistency, even in absence of partitions, thus providing a more complete portrayal of the potential consistency trade-offs for distributed systems.

A high availability requirement implies that the system must replicate data. As soon as a distributed system replicates data, a trade-off between consistency and latency arises.

The PACELC theorem was first described by Daniel J. Abadi from Yale University in 2010 in a blog post, which he later clarified in a paper in 2012. The purpose of PACELC is to address his thesis that "Ignoring the consistency/latency trade-off of replicated systems is a major oversight [in CAP], as it is present at all times during system operation, whereas CAP is only relevant in the arguably rare case of a network partition." The PACELC theorem was proved formally in 2018 in a SIGACT News article.

Database PACELC ratings 

Original database PACELC ratings are from. Subsequent updates contributed by wikipedia community.

 The default versions of Amazon's early (internal) Dynamo, Cassandra, Riak and Cosmos DB are PA/EL systems: if a partition occurs, they give up consistency for availability, and under normal operation they give up consistency for lower latency.
 Fully ACID systems such as VoltDB/H-Store, Megastore, MySQL Cluster and PostgreSQL are PC/EC: they refuse to give up consistency, and will pay the availability and latency costs to achieve it. BigTable and related systems such as HBase are also PC/EC.
 Amazon DynamoDB (launched January 2012) is quite different from the early (Amazon internal) Dynamo which was considered for the PACELC paper. DynamoDB follows a strong leader model, where every write is strictly serialized (and conditional writes carry no penalty) and supports read-after-write consistency. This guarantee does not apply to "Global Tables" across regions. The DynamoDB SDKs use eventually consistent reads by default (improved availability and throughput), but when a consistent read is requested the service will return either a current view to the item or an error.
Couchbase provides a range of consistency and availability options during a partition, and equally a range of latency and consistency options with no partition.  Unlike most other databases, Couchbase doesn't have a single API set nor does it scale/replicate all data services homogeneously.  For writes, Couchbase favors Consistency over Availability making it formally CP, but on read there is more user-controlled variability depending on index replication, desired consistency level and type of access (single document lookup vs range scan vs full-text search, etc.).  On top of that, there is then further variability depending on cross-datacenter-replication (XDCR) which takes multiple CP clusters and connects them with asynchronous replication and Couchbase Lite which is an embedded database and creates a fully multi-master (with revision tracking) distributed topology.
 Cosmos DB supports five tunable consistency levels that allow for tradeoffs between C/A during P, and L/C during E. Cosmos DB never violates the specified consistency level, so it's formally CP.
 MongoDB can be classified as a PA/EC system. In the baseline case, the system guarantees reads and writes to be consistent.
 PNUTS is a PC/EL system.
 Hazelcast IMDG and indeed most in-memory data grids are an implementation of a PA/EC system; Hazelcast can be configured to be EL rather than EC. Concurrency primitives (Lock, AtomicReference, CountDownLatch, etc.) can be either PC/EC or PA/EC. 
 FaunaDB implements Calvin, a transaction protocol created by Dr. Daniel Abadi, the author of the PACELC theorem, and offers users adjustable controls for LC tradeoff. It is PC/EC for strictly serializable transactions, and EL for serializable reads.

See also 
 CAP theorem
 Consistency model
 Fallacies of Distributed Computing
 Paxos (computer science)
 Project management triangle
 Raft (computer science)
 Trilemma

Notes

References

External links 

 "Consistency Tradeoffs in Modern Distributed Database System Design", by Daniel J. Abadi, Yale University Original paper that formalized PACELC
 "Problems with CAP, and Yahoo’s little known NoSQL system", by Daniel J. Abadi, Yale University. Original blog post that first described PACELC
 "Proving PACELC", by Wojciech Golab, University of Waterloo Formal proof of the PACELC theorem

Distributed computing
Database theory